Apricot Groves is a 2016 Armenian–Iranian drama film directed by Pouria Heidary Oureh. The film is one of the most internationally appeared film in the history of Armenian cinema, with dozens of international film festival selections.

Development

In an interview with CivilNet, director Pouria Heidary Oureh stated that after being initially provided support by Armenian film authorities, the support was withdrawn following the completion of the film:

Plot
Aram, an Iranian Armenian youth who has immigrated to the United States in childhood, visits Armenia for the first time to propose to an Armenian girlfriend Aram met and lived with in the United States. Aram sees many cultural, religious, and national differences on the one-day trip, but more difficult obstacles remain, such as a gender affirmation surgery in neighboring Iran.

Cast
 Narbe Vartan as Vartan
 Hovhannes Azoyan as Arman
 Allison Gangi as Bride
 Samvel Sarkisyan as Father
 Maro Hakobyan as Mother
 Araik Sargsyan as Uncle
 Azadeh Esmaeilkhani as Nurse
 Tigran Davtyan as Duduk Player
 Ara Karagyan as Barber
 Edgar Manucharyan as Bartender
 Saeed Bojnoordi as Immigration Officer

Reception

At the 2017 Arpa International Film Festival, the film was nominated for Best Screenplay, Best Director and Best Feature Film. During that same year's Pomegranate Film Festival, the film was nominated for Best Feature Film.

Screenings and censorship

2017 Golden Apricot Yerevan International Film Festival
Filmmakers who had submitted their work to be screened at the 2017 Golden Apricot Yerevan International Film Festival in an off-competition program entitled, "Armenians: Internal And External Views,” were informed by event organizers that the screening of the program had been cancelled, without elaborating on a reason for this decision. Activists took to social media to criticize the event cancellation, with some claiming that two LGBT+-themed films — Apricot Groves and Listen to Me: Untold Stories Beyond Hatred — were the reason for the cancellation. 

Atom Egoyan and Arsinée Khanjian, prominent Armenian Canadian figures in cinema, denounced this cancellation, stating that it was "dismaying to see a festival that we both proudly advocated for within the international film community in the name of films and filmmakers that spoke of such urgent human rights issues can be suppressed, especially when these ideas need to be discussed and brought to light." An open letter signed by filmmakers, LGBT+ activists, politicians and others stated that "This institution which is accepted by the Armenian society should not block and hinder the development of Armenian cinematography." LGBTQ+ rights organization Pink Armenia called the cancellation "not only discrimination against Armenian LGBT community, and violation of freedom of expression and freedom to create, but also a slap to Armenian cinematography[.]" The European Union's Eastern Partnership Civil Society Forum called on Armenian authorities to fulfill their international commitments, stating that "The incident has a negative impact on the reputation of the country and runs contrary to the process of Armenia's joining the Creative Europe programme."

Other screenings
Following the Golden Apricot cancellation, the film was screened at the 2017 Arpa International Film Festival in Los Angeles. This screening was applauded by GALAS LGBTQ+ Armenian Society. 

The film was screened at the 2017 Pomegranate Film Festival in Toronto.

References

2016 films
2016 drama films
2016 LGBT-related films
LGBT in Armenia
Transgender-related films
Films about trans men
LGBT-related drama films
LGBT-related controversies in film
Films set in Armenia
Armenian drama films
Armenian-language films
Films set in Iran
Iranian drama films
Persian-language films
2010s Persian-language films
Iranian LGBT-related films